Archibasis mimetes  is a species of damselfly in the family Coenagrionidae,
commonly known as a blue-banded longtail. 
It is a medium-sized damselfly; the male is bright blue and black.
It has been recorded from New Guinea and northern Australia,
where it inhabits streams.

Etymology
The species name mimetes is from a Greek word meaning imitative. Robin Tillyard named this species of damselfly after its close resemblance to Pseudagrion australasiae.

Gallery

See also
 List of Odonata species of Australia

References 

Coenagrionidae
Odonata of Australia
Insects of Australia
Insects of New Guinea
Taxa named by Robert John Tillyard
Insects described in 1913
Damselflies